The 2020 2nd Red Bull Ring FIA Formula 2 round was a pair of motor races for Formula 2 cars that took place on 11 and 12 July 2020 at the Red Bull Ring in Spielberg, in Austria as part of the FIA Formula 2 Championship. It was the second round of the 2020 FIA Formula 2 Championship and ran in support of the 2020 Styrian Grand Prix.

Classification

Qualifying

Feature Race 

Notes:
 – Artem Markelov could not start the race after spinning off into the gravel on the way to the starting grid. His grid slot was then left vacant.

Sprint race

Standings after the event

Drivers' Championship standings

Teams' Championship standings

 Note: Only the top five positions are included for both sets of standings.

See also 
2020 Styrian Grand Prix
2020 2nd Spielberg Formula 3 round

References

External links 

Spielberg, 2nd
Spielberg, 2nd